= Hanes 500 =

Hanes 500 may refer to the following NASCAR races at Martinsville Speedway:

- Blu-Emu Maximum Pain Relief 500, 1991–1995
- First Data 500, 1996–1997
